Freed is an unincorporated community in Calhoun County, West Virginia, United States.

The community most likely was named after the local Freed family.

References 

Unincorporated communities in West Virginia
Unincorporated communities in Calhoun County, West Virginia